Breynat is a hamlet in northern Alberta, Canada within Athabasca County. it is  west of Highway 63,  northeast of Edmonton.

Demographics 
Breynat recorded a population of 22 in the 1991 Census of Population conducted by Statistics Canada.

See also 
List of communities in Alberta
List of hamlets in Alberta

References  

Athabasca County
Hamlets in Alberta